Cadaba insularis is a critically endangered shrub in the Capparaceae family endemic to the island of Socotra in Yemen. Its natural habitat is subtropical or tropical dry shrubland, and is threatened by habitat loss.

References

insularis
Endemic flora of Socotra
Critically endangered plants
Taxonomy articles created by Polbot
Plants described in 2004